This is a list of rivers of Saint Pierre and Miquelon. Rivers are listed in clockwise order, starting at the north end of each island.

Saint Pierre Island
Ruisseau Patural

Miquelon Island
Ruisseau du Chapeau
Ruisseau de la Carcasse de l'Est 
Ruisseau de Terre Grasse
Ruisseau du Trou Hangar
Petit Ruisseau
Ruisseau à Blondin
Ruisseau des Godiches
Ruisseau de la Demoiselle
Ruisseau à Sylvain
Ruisseau de l' Étang de la Loutre
Ruisseau du Nordet
Ruisseau du Milieu
Ruisseau de la Presqu'île
Ruisseau de la Mère Durand
Ruisseau de la Pointe au Cheval
Ruisseau Creux
Ruisseau du Renard
Ruisseau de la Carcasse
Ruisseau du Foin au Curé
Ruisseau du Foin à Raymond
Ruisseau du Foin à Bancal
Ruisseau des Eperlans
Ruisseau du Petit Cap

Le Cap
Ruisseau des Cosies
Ruisseau Tabaron
Ruisseau de l' Anse

Langlade Island
Belle Rivière
Ruisseau des Mats 
Fourche Droite Ruisseau
Fourche Gauche Ruisseau
Ruisseau de l’Anse aux Soldats
Ruisseau de l’Anse
Ruisseau du Trou à la Baleine 
Ruisseau du Cap aux Voleurs
Dolisie Ruisseau
Le Canal Noir 
Deuxième Ruisseau Maquine 
Premier Ruisseau Maquine 
Ruisseau de la Cascade
Ruisseau Clotaire
Ruisseau Dupont
Ruisseau de Cap Sauveur
Ruisseau de l' Ouest
Ruisseau Debons
Ruisseau Mouton
Ruisseau de la Goélette

References
 GEOnet Names Server

Saint Pierre and Miquelon
Rivers of Saint Pierre and Miquelon
Environment of Saint Pierre and Miquelon